The Parable is the second studio album by the Jimmy Chamberlin Complex (side project band of The Smashing Pumpkins/Zwan drummer Jimmy Chamberlin). It was released on November 6, 2017 as a digital download, and the physical edition was released 2 weeks after the digital download's release. This is the first album since the 2005 debut, Life Begins Again. The album was produced by Chamberlin's longtime collaborator, Billy Mohler.

Track listing 
All songs were written by Jimmy Chamberlin

 Horus and the Pharaoh – 6:19
 The Parable – 6:50
 Thoughts of Days Long Past – 4:17
 El Born – 6:12
 Magick Moon – 4:52
 Dance of the Grebe – 7:40

Personnel 
 Jimmy Chamberlin – drums, percussion
 Billy Mohler – bass guitar, production
 Chris Speed – clarinet, saxophone
 Sean Woolstenhulme – guitar
 Randy Ingram – keyboard
 Husky Hoskulds – engineering
 Nate Wood – mastering

References 

2017 albums
The Jimmy Chamberlin Complex albums
Albums produced by Billy Mohler